Social Circle is a city in southern Walton County, extending into Newton County, in the U.S. state of Georgia, 45 miles east of Atlanta.

History
It is unclear why the name "Social Circle" was applied to this place. According to tradition, Social Circle was named from an incident in which a group of people living in the settlement offered water to a weary traveler, whose response was "This certainly is a social circle". The city also officially notes that a citizen of another village community which was already known by the name of Social Circle joined the settlement in its early days.

Social Circle was incorporated as a town in 1869, and as a city in 1904.

Geographical data

A CSX Transportation line maintenance facility operates in the city's railroad station. The city's railyard contains one of the relatively few remaining concrete coaling towers in the southeastern United States.

Demographics

2020 census

As of the 2020 United States census, there were 4,974 people, 1,598 households, and 1,301 families residing in the city.

2010
According to United States Census data, there were about 4,500 people, 1,671 households, 
and 1,210 families residing in the city. The racial makeup of the city was 67% White, 30% African American, 0.5% Native American, 1% Asian, less than 0.5% were Pacific Islander, 0.5% were from other races, and 0.4% from two or more races. Hispanic or Latino of any race were 8% of the population.

There were 1,671 occupied households, of which about 40.9% had children under the age of 18 living with them, 49% were married couples living together, 17.8% had a female householder with no husband present, and 4% were non-families. Also, 24% of all households were people living alone and 3.2% had someone living alone who was 65 years of age or older. The average household size was 2.7 people.

In the city, the population was spread out, with 29% under the age of 18, 8% from 18 to 24, 29% from 25 to 44, 26% from 45 to 64, and 8% who were 65 years of age or older.  The median age was 34.5 years. The female sector accounted for about 48.7% of the population, while males accounted for about 51.3%.
 
The median income for a household in the city was $47,027. The per capita income for the 
city was $22,129. About 19% of families and 23% of the city's population were below the poverty line, 
including 43% of those under age 18, and 12% of those age 65 or over.

Transportation
Through highways

Nearby highways

Education
The Social Circle City School District holds pre-school to grade twelve, and consists of two elementary schools, a middle school, and a high school. The district has 90 full-time teachers and over 1,448 students.
Social Circle Primary School
Social Circle Elementary School
Social Circle Middle School
Social Circle High School

Notable people
Danny McDevitt – former baseball pitcher, retired here
Kyle Chandler – actor
Alonzo F. Herndon - Georgia’s first African-American millionaire

In popular culture
 A season 5 episode of the Discovery Channel series A Haunting, called The Exorcism of Cindy Sauer, takes place in Social Circle in 2010.

 Paramount+ Movie: Jerry and Marge Go Large was filmed mainly in Social Circle, GA. All “downtown” scenes shot on location, not in Evart, MI.

See also

Jay C. (Jack) Higginbotham (May 11, 1906 – May 26, 1973) was an internationally known Jazz trombonist, born in Social Circle, Georgia.

References

External links

 Official website

Cities in Georgia (U.S. state)
Cities in Newton County, Georgia
Cities in Walton County, Georgia